The 1917 Milan–San Remo was the tenth edition of the Milan–San Remo cycle race and was held on 15 April 1917. The race started in Milan and finished in San Remo. The race was won by Gaetano Belloni.

General classification

References

1917
1917 in road cycling
1917 in Italian sport
April 1917 sports events